Twenty Polish Christmas Carols is a collection of Polish carols arranged for soprano and piano in 1946 by Polish composer Witold Lutosławski (1913–1994) and then orchestrated by him for soprano, female choir and orchestra in 1984–1989. The music and lyrics were taken mostly from 19th-century printed sources.

History
Twenty Polish Christmas Carols is a composition by Witold Lutosławski. It is based on Christmas carols collected by the composer in 1946 in Poland at the request of the Director of the Polish Music Publishing.

In the years leading up to this event, occupation by Nazi Germany and The Soviet Union had had a devastating effect on Poland. The post-war years were times of daily hardship. The cultural sphere was influenced by conservative ideologies and the totalitarian authorities in place at the time. In such a climate, collecting Christmas carols was a relatively safe and harmless activity.

Arranging the collected Christmas Carols, Lutosławski first wrote for only voice and piano. Aniela Szleminska (soprano) and Jan Hoffman then performed a part of the completed work in Kraków.

The work then disappeared until almost 40 years later, when Lutoslawski re-arranged the carols for soprano, a female chorus and orchestra.

On December 15, 1985 this version was performed for the first time. Marie Slorach sang accompanied by the London Symphony Orchestra with a choir.

On December 14, 1990 the Chamber Orchestra of Scotland, with accompanying choir, played the work with soloist Susan Hamilton in Edinburgh. This version was equipped with English-language texts, while all previous versions had been performed in Polish.

Twenty Polish Christmas Carols have been likened to folk-song pieces by Ralph Vaughan Williams .

The Polish texts were drawn from books:

 Śpiewnik Kościelny - collection of Polish 19th century sacred songs by Michał Mioduszewski (1838–1853)
 Pastorałki i kolędy z melodyjami – collection of 17th to 19th century Polish sacred Christmas carols by Michał Mioduszewski (1843)
 Lud vol.16: Lubelskie by Oskar Kolberg (1883)
 Lud vol.22: Leczyckie by Oskar Kolberg (1899)

Carols

Orchestration
 Soprano
 SSAA (sopranos and altos )
 1 flute, 1 oboe / cor anglais, 2 clarinets (II also bass clarinet), 1 bassoon
 Two horns, one trumpet, one trombone
 Percussion, 1 harp, piano
 Violins, violas, cellos, double basses

See also
 List of Christmas carols

References

Compositions by Witold Lutosławski
Christmas carol collections
1946 compositions